Trpín may refer to:

 Trpín (Svitavy District), a municipality in the Pardubice Region of the Czech Republic
 Trpín, Krupina District, a municipality in the Banská Bystrica Region of Slovakia